The Seoul Education Museum is an education museum in Seoul, South Korea.

See also
History of Korea
List of museums in Seoul
List of museums in South Korea

 

Jongno District
Museums in Seoul
Education museums